Bereznik is a rural locality (a village) in Pinezhsky District, Arkhangelsk Oblast, Russia. The population was 1 as of 2012.

Geography 
It is located on the Pinega River.

References 

Rural localities in Pinezhsky District